Thawan Thamrongnawasawat (also spelt Thawal Thamrongnavaswadhi or Thawal Thamrongnavasawat; ,), born Thawan Tharisawat (21 November 1901 – 3 December 1988), was the eighth Prime Minister of Thailand from 1946–1947. Before becoming a politician, he was a naval officer, holding the rank of rear admiral.

Education 
 Ayutthaya Wittayalai School
 Debsirin School
 Chulalongkorn University
 Royal Thai Naval Academy

Careers 

A career naval officer of Chinese ancestry, Thamrong was a leading member of the anti-Japanese Free Thai Movement resistance movement during World War II. He became Thailand's elected prime minister on 23 August 1946, replacing Pridi Banomyong. However, he was removed from office by a military coup orchestrated by Field Marshal Plaek Phibunsongkhram on 8 November 1947. Khuang Aphaiwong then assumed the post of prime minister.

After King Rama VII abdicated the throne, Thamrong was appointed by the government to be the leader of a faculty of representatives to travel to invite Prince Ananda Mahidol, who was living in Switzerland with his mother and two siblings, to ascend to the throne as King Rama VIII of the Chakri dynasty.

However, due to political fluctuations, a coup eventually occurred originating from within a group of soldiers led by Phin Choonhavan on 8 November 1947, resulting in Thamrong having to leave the country and stay in Hong Kong for a period. When Thamrong later returned to Thailand he was appointed as a member of the Constitutional Drafting Assembly. After that, he lived a relatively quietly life.

Death 
Thawan Thamrongnawasawat died on 3 December 1988 at Phramongkutklao Hospital, aged 87 years, being the first and only naval officer to date who has served as prime minister.

Academic rank
 1939 Adjunct Professor of Thammasat University

Royal decorations
Thawan has received the following royal decorations in the Honours System of Thailand:
  Knight Grand Cordon (Special Class) of the Most Exalted Order of the White Elephant
  Knight Grand Cordon (Special Class) of The Most Noble Order of the Crown of Thailand
  Victory Medal - World War II 
  Safeguarding the Constitution Medal
  Medal for Service Rendered in the Indochina (Franco-Thai War)
  Medal for Service in the Interior - Asia (Pacific War)
  Chakrabarti Mala Medal
  King Rama VIII Royal Cypher Medal, 1st

References

1901 births
1988 deaths
Thawan Thamrongnawasawat
Thawan Thamrongnawasawat
Thawan Thamrongnawasawat
Thawan Thamrongnawasawat
Thawan Thamrongnawasawat
Thawan Thamrongnawasawat
Thawan Thamrongnawasawat
Thawan Thamrongnawasawat
Thawan Thamrongnawasawat
Thawan Thamrongnawasawat
Thawan Thamrongnawasawat
Thawan Thamrongnawasawat
Leaders ousted by a coup